Sinocyclocheilus broadihornes is a species of cyprinid fish in the genus Sinocyclocheilus.

References 

broadihornes
Fish described in 2007